SUNY Downstate Medical Center is a public medical school and hospital in Brooklyn, New York. It is the southernmost member of the State University of New York (SUNY) system and the only academic medical center for health education, research, and patient care serving Brooklyn's 2.5 million residents. As of Fall 2018, it had a total student body of 1,846 and approximately 8,000 faculty and staff.

Downstate Health Sciences University comprises a College of Medicine, Colleges of Nursing, School of Graduate Studies, School of Health Professions, and School of Public Health, and University Hospital of Brooklyn. It also includes a major research complex and biotechnology facilities.

SUNY Downstate ranks eighth nationally in the number of alumni who are on the faculty of American medical schools. More physicians practicing in New York City graduated from Downstate than from any other medical school. With 1,040 residents (young physicians in training), Downstate's residency program is the 16th largest in the country.

SUNY Downstate Health Sciences University is the fourth largest employer in Brooklyn. Eighty-six percent of its employees are New York City residents; 68 percent live in Brooklyn. The medical center's total direct, indirect, and induced economic impact on New York State is in excess of $2 billion. SUNY Downstate Medical Center attracted close to $100 million in external research funding in 2011, which includes $26 million from federal sources. It ranks fourth among SUNY campuses in grant expenditures, and second among SUNY's academic health centers.

History

In 2010 SUNY Downstate celebrated its sesquicentennial, commemorating the year that the Long Island College Hospital (as it was then known) first opened its doors to students. Yet Downstate traces its roots back even further (to 1856) when a small group of physicians set up a free dispensary in Brooklyn to care for poor immigrants.

Known as the German General Dispensary, its original aim was to care for indigent Germans living in Brooklyn, but changing demographics soon required it to broaden its outreach.  In 1857 it was reorganized as a charitable institution and renamed The St. John's Hospital—the first of many name changes.

Officially chartered by the state in 1858 as the Long Island College Hospital of the City of Brooklyn, it was authorized to operate a hospital and confer medical degrees on candidates who attended two lecture courses and completed a three-year preceptorship under a practicing physician. The notion that care at the hospital bedside should be included as an essential part of medical training was revolutionary for its time, but other medical schools soon adopted the approach and it came to be regarded as essential pedagogy.

In 1860 the school officially opened its doors to 57 (male) students. It was one of only 11 medical schools to admit African American students. The first faculty included many distinguished physicians, such as Dr. Austin Flint Sr., remembered for his role in introducing the stethoscope into standard medical practice in this country. Dr. Flint delivered the commencement address on July 24, 1860, when the school graduated its first new doctors.

In the following decades The Long Island College Hospital greatly expanded both its facilities and medical school curriculum. By the time of the First World War, admission was opened to women and postgraduate training had been introduced.  In 1930 the college and hospital were separated from one another so that each would be under its own governing board. The following year, the school was rechartered as the Long Island College of Medicine.

In 1945, the college purchased a large tract of land that would become the site of the future Downstate Medical Center. The “Downstate” era began on April 5, 1950, with the signing of a merger contract between the State University of New York (SUNY) and the Long Island College of Medicine. The medical center came to be known as Downstate to distinguish it from the SUNY medical center in Syracuse, New York, which is known as “Upstate”.  Several years later the current campus was built in the East Flatbush section of Brooklyn.

In 1954 President Dwight D. Eisenhower laid the cornerstone for the Basic Sciences Building. In the following years, the complex grew rapidly, with the addition of a student center and residence halls, as well as a nurses' residence. In 1966 Governor Nelson Rockefeller officiated at the dedication of University Hospital of Brooklyn (UHB), Downstate's own teaching hospital. The School of Graduate Studies, the College of Health Related Professions, and the College of Nursing were established that same year. In 1987 Governor Mario Cuomo and Mayor Edward Koch helped break ground for the new Health Science Education Building, where most student classes now take place.

More recently, the medical center has entered a period of renewed growth and expansion. In addition to the completion of a multimillion-dollar capital improvement program for the hospital and new clinical and research facilities, the campus has expanded to include a Biotechnology Park and Advanced Biotechnology Incubator, and School of Public Health. The School of Public Health was structurally engineered by Leslie E. Robertson Associates, and designed by Ennead Architects.

The Advanced Biotechnology Incubator, designed for start-up and early-stage biotech companies, includes a commercial synthetic chemistry facility. Construction is underway to develop biotech research and  manufacturing at the Brooklyn Army Terminal.  These initiatives are part of a strategic plan to position SUNY Downstate as the center for biomedical discovery and development in Brooklyn.

Academics

SUNY Downstate offers students a broad professional education that prepares them for practice or careers in any location and community. The vast majority of students are drawn from the New York City metropolitan area. Many have immigrant backgrounds and are members of racial and cultural groups who are underrepresented in the health professions. The differences in background and outlook enhance the quality of the educational experience of all students.

Downstate's Colleges of Medicine, Nursing, and Health Related Professions and its School of Graduate Studies and School of Public Health collectively offer more than 30 health-focused programs.

College of Medicine

The College of Medicine, which grants the MD degree, is the 32nd oldest college of medicine in the country. With approximately 800 enrollees, it is one of the largest colleges of medicine in New York State. It ranks eighth out of 140 accredited medical schools in the nation in the number of alumni who hold faculty positions at U.S. medical schools. More physicians practicing in New York City graduated from Downstate's College of Medicine than from any other medical school.

In addition to granting the MD degree, the college sponsors a combined MD/PhD degree with the School of Graduate Studies.

School of Graduate Studies

Of the School of Graduate Studies' three multidisciplinary core programs, Neural and Behavioral Science is the oldest. Faculty research in the neurosciences is especially deep, ranging from the molecular to the behavioral. The Program in Molecular and Cellular Biology has concentrations in cardiovascular, fundamental cellular and molecular biology, cancer biology, and more. The Program in Biomedical Engineering, run jointly with the Polytechnic Institute of NYU, features concentrations in neurorobotics, imaging, and materials.

The School of Graduate Studies has also partnered with the College of Nanoscale Science and Engineering (CSNE) of the University at Albany to offer a combined MD/PhD degree program in nanoscale medicine. This clinical scientist education program provides hands-on training in the development and application of nanotechnology to advance health care. MD training at Downstate is coupled with PhD training in either nanoscale science or nanoscale engineering.

School of Public Health

The first new school established at SUNY Downstate since 1966, the School of Public Health was launched in 2001 as an MPH degree program within the Department of Preventive Medicine and Community Health in the College of Medicine. In 2008 it declared school status and was fully accredited by the Council on Education for Public Health in 2010. It currently offers five master's and three doctoral programs, as well as combined degree programs.

College of Health Related Professions

An upper-division undergraduate and graduate school, the College of Health Related Professions has graduated close to 4,000 allied health professionals since its establishment in 1966. Approximately 80 percent of students  have four-year college degrees in other fields upon enrollment. Its direct-entry midwifery program was the first of its kind in the nation.

College of Nursing

The College of Nursing offers an undergraduate, upper-division RN-to-BS degree program for students who are already licensed as professional nurses and an Accelerated BS program for students who hold a degree in another field and seek basic preparation for beginning nursing practice. The college is one of only four nursing schools in New York State to offer master's degree programs in all advanced nursing practice roles.

Patient care

University Hospital of Brooklyn 

University Hospital of Brooklyn (UHB) offers comprehensive, advanced medical care throughout Brooklyn. It includes a full-service, comprehensive hospital site (UHB at Central Brooklyn) plus a free-standing Urgent Care and Ambulatory Surgery Center in Bay Ridge and nine ambulatory satellite sites. UHB is licensed for 882 beds and annually provides care to over 300,000 patients. UHB is an 8-story facility with 8 intensive care and step-down units, 12 operating rooms, an adult and pediatric ER, diagnostic and ambulatory surgery facility, and 75 outpatient clinics. The flagship location for UHB, Central Brooklyn includes three community-based health centers in the neighborhoods of East New York, Bedford-Stuyvesant, and Midwood, plus a freestanding Dialysis Center.

Specialized services
Comprehensive cardiovascular services, including 24/7 angioplasty services and heart surgery;
Comprehensive neurological services, including diagnosis and treatment for stroke, epilepsy, sleep disorders, and Alzheimer's disease;
Adult/pediatric emergency services: the ER receives more than 68,906 patient visits a year [2010 data for University Hospital Central Brooklyn location];
Kidney dialysis – the only pediatric dialysis center in Brooklyn.
Sports medicine;
HIV/AIDS treatment and support services — Downstate is a designated AIDS treatment center;
Maternal and infant health—Downstate is a designated Regional Perinatal Center.

HEAT (Health and Education Alternatives for Teens) Program

HEAT is a program established and directed by Dr. Jeffrey Birnbaum which offers culturally competent care for youth who are living at high risk of developing HIV/AIDS. HEAT has a special focus on care for lesbian, gay, bisexual and transgender youth but does not limit its services to these populations. The program offers comprehensive clinical services for HIV/AIDS patients as well as sexual health and transgender care services.

HEAT is actively involved in community outreach and Dr. Brinbaum has received various awards for his efforts in combating HIV/AIDS

Brooklyn Free Clinic

The Brooklyn Free Clinic (BFC) is a student-run free clinic operated primarily by the students of the College of Medicine. The BFC offers medical and psychiatric care and health maintenance screening to the uninsured populations of Brooklyn.

The clinic hosts an annual conference on health seen through the eyes of medicine, art, technology and community called BFC What's Next. The clinic has won multiple awards for its advertisement campaigns including a gold medal in conjunction with CDMiConnect at the 2014 MMM Awards for their "We Need U" campaign and a bronze medal at the CLIO Healthcare Awards.

SUNY Downstate at Bay Ridge 

SUNY Downstate at Bay Ridge serves the communities of Bay Ridge/Dyker Heights, Bensonhurst, and Sunset Park. It features a walk-in Urgent Care Center, Ambulatory Surgery Center, Advanced Endoscopy Center, and Laser Vision Correction Center. It has onsite laboratory and radiology diagnostic facilities and medical offices for doctors in many clinical specialties.

Research
SUNY Downstate is an important research facility where scientists and clinicians explore many urgent health problems. Historically, areas of research strength include cardiovascular biology, neuroscience, and instrumentation. Current strengths include GABAergic inhibition, learning and memory mechanisms; pathogenesis of atherosclerosis and cardiomyopathy; robotic prosthetic devices; HIV/AIDS; pain and addiction; optical tomography imaging technology; and fundamental cell biology (mechanisms of transcription and translation).

Downstate's role as the only academic medical center in Brooklyn is central to its powerful role in clinical, translational, and public health research. Downstate's research spans the entire “bench to bedside” spectrum as an integrated entity, bringing together basic scientists, clinical researchers, and practitioners with common interests.

Downstate is the fourth highest grant recipient of SUNY's 64 campuses. In FY 2011, sponsored research programs, including those funded by the National Institutes of Health (NIH), DARPA, and private foundations, totaled over $60 million. Downstate is the only healthcare facility in Brooklyn that holds the Nobel Prize in Medicine or Physiology.

Controversies 
In 2013, SUNY Downstate released a court ordered financial audit which found the institution in need of capital funds citing large losses from 2007 through 2011. The audit cited bloated salaries for top administrators, underuse and poor financial decisions contributed to the losses.

In January 2020, two SUNY Downstate surgeons filed lawsuits accusing the medical center of retaliation against them for reporting patient safety and death concerns in the heart-surgery and organ-transplant programs. Prior to the complaint, the institution paused these two programs in July 2019 due to pressure from the New York State Department of Health and the United Network for Organ Sharing when reviewers found issues in the programs and recommended a more extensive review in hopes to remediate the problems.

Notable faculty

Alexander Skene, MD - authority on women's diseases; discovered the paraurethral glands known as Skene's ducts (1880).
Robert L. Dickinson, MD - published first “modern” pamphlet on voluntary birth control (1931).
 Chandler McCuskey Brooks, PhD - the Graduate School's founder, laid much of the groundwork in spinal cord and hypothalamic physiology, and cardiac pacemaker function (1950s).
Robert Furchgott, PhD - awarded Nobel Prize in Medicine or Physiology for research on nitric oxide (1998).
Carl Axel Gemzell, MD/PhD - first to use FSH to treat anovulatory women.

Research centers and major laboratories 

Alzheimer's Disease Research Program
Brooklyn Center for Health Disparities
Center for Biomedical Imaging
Center for Cardiovascular Muscle Research
Center for Neurorobotics and Neuroengineering
Center for Treatment and Study of Endometriosis
Cancer Research Focus Group
Henri Begleiter Neurodynamics Laboratory (Genetics of Alcoholism)
HIV Center for Women and Children
Northeast Terrorism Preparedness, Training, Education, and Research Center
Transgenic Mouse Core Facility

See also
 University Hospital of Brooklyn at Long Island College Hospital
State University of New York Upstate Medical University

References

External links
 Official website

Teaching hospitals in New York City
Hospitals in Brooklyn
Universities and colleges in New York City
Nursing schools in New York City
Hospitals established in 1860
Educational institutions established in 1860
Universities and colleges in Brooklyn
East Flatbush, Brooklyn
Schools of medicine in New York City

Downstate